The Chartered Company Monument is a monument in the town of Sandakan in Sabah, Malaysia dedicated to the British servicemen or employees who were killed at the end of the 19th century. The monument was built by the British North Borneo Company and part of the Sandakan Heritage Trails, a trail which connects the historic sights of Sandakan.

History 

To commemorate the death of a British explorer in March 1883, Frank Hatton who died during his expedition to Segama River, the North Borneo Chartered Company announced the establishment of a memorial briefly after his death. The plan was also probably because the body of Hattons cannot be sent home to England. Another early British pioneer and explorer, Franz Xavier Wittisheim already been commemorate in June 1882 at the Sibuco River after he gets killed during a strain with the Muruts.

Shortly before the completion of his book "North Borneo – Explorations and Adventures on the equator" in 1885, his father learned that the company's plans had changed:

By the will of the officials, three other names been placed on the stone. A Celtic cross was later added as a memorial to the deceased. William Hood Treacher, the Governor of North Borneo noted in his 1891 memoirs: "A memorial cross has been erected in Sandakan for Witti, Hatton, de Fontaine and the officers and soldiers of the Sikh who lost their lives in the service of the Government".

Inscription 

The monument has the shape of a Celtic cross on a four-stepped rectangular base. The front panels and the side plates bear inscriptions with the names of deceased official of the Chartered Company. Today, the front site has been renovated and the typeface was slightly modernised. The memorial inscription on the front reads:

The monument is located between 1885 to 1890.

During the renovation of the commemorative inscription, there is an error. The year "1883" mistakenly described for the assassination of Dr. Manson Fraser and Asa Sing Jemadhar rather than killed during a deadly attack in Kawang on 12 May 1885.

Site 

Old pictures of the government building show the Celtic cross prominently in front of the district office. Also on images from the estate of the American documentary filmmaker Martin and Osa Johnson, the monument is situated in front of the government building. Images from the 1960s show that the place had not changed since then. During the construction of the new municipal administration building, the monument was placed in storage. Its current location is in a prominent spot in the MPS Square, fronting the MPS (Sandakan Municipal Council) and the Heritage Buildings as well as the Court House.

References 

Buildings and structures in Sandakan
Monuments and memorials in Sabah